The 2022–23 season is the 124th season in the history of SV Werder Bremen and their first season back in the top flight. The club is participating in the Bundesliga and the DFB-Pokal.

Players

Current squad

Players out on loan

Transfers

In

Out

Pre-season and friendlies

Competitions

Overall record

Bundesliga

League table

Results summary

Results by round

Matches 
The league fixtures were announced on 17 June 2022.

DFB-Pokal

References

SV Werder Bremen seasons
Werder Bremen